Rezaviyeh (also Romanized as Reẕavīyeh; also known as Morteẕavīyeh (Persian: مرتضويه) and Murtazavīyeh) is a village in Jolgeh-e Mazhan Rural District, Jolgeh-e Mazhan District, Khusf County, South Khorasan Province, Iran. At the 2006 census, its population was 52, in 13 families.

References 

Populated places in Khusf County